is the collective name for three middle Jōmon period settlement traces located in the Kogasaka neighborhood of the city of Machida, Tokyo in the Kantō region of Japan. It received protection as a National Historic Site in 1926. The designation was modified in 2009.

Overview
At each location, the ruins of a pit dwelling with a flagstone floor dating from the middle Jōmon period was discovered in 1918. This was the first instance of flagstone floors being discovered in the Kantō region, and led to the National Historic Site designation in 1926.  

At present, only the Rōba Site survives and is open to the public. The dwelling has a slightly oblong shape, with a major axis of 5 meters and a minor axis of 3.5 meters. The remains are now preserved under a small building which was built in 2017 and can be viewed through a glass cover.

The Inariyama site was located about 27 meters southwest of the Rōba site and was partially destroyed in road construction. Currently, it is backfilled, and the actual remains cannot be seen, but the appearance of the remains is reproduced on a placard.

The Hachimantai site is located on a plateau about 800 meters north of both sites. At the Hachimantai site, the dwelling had a circular plan with a diameter of 3.45 meters. It was backfilled after a complete excavation in 1968.  The site is not open to the public, but Machida City has plants to develop the area into an archaeological park in the future.

The Rōba ruins are about a 13-minute walk from Machida Station on the Odakyu Electric Railway Odawara Line.

See also
List of Historic Sites of Japan (Tōkyō)

References

External links
 Machida City home page 
 Tokyo Cultural Properties Database 

Jōmon period
History of Tokyo
Machida, Tokyo
Historic Sites of Japan